Nana Eshun (born 12 December 1982) is a Ghanaian footballer who plays for Asyut Petroleum of the Egyptian Premier League, as a striker.

Career
Eshun has played in Ghana for King Faisal Babes, in Italy for Udinese, in Germany for Borussia Dortmund and SF Neitersen, and in Georgia for Lokomotivi Tbilisi. He moved to Peruvian side Universitario de Deportes in April 2004.  In July 2009, while contracted to Ghanaian side Berekum Chelsea, Eshun went on trial with Egyptian side Zamalek, eventually signing for league rivals Asyut Petroleum in January 2010. He made his debut for Asyut Petroleum in March 2010.

References

1982 births
Living people
Ghanaian footballers
Ghanaian expatriate sportspeople in Italy
Udinese Calcio players
Ghanaian expatriate sportspeople in Egypt
Asyut Petroleum SC players
Ghanaian expatriate sportspeople in Germany
Borussia Dortmund II players
Expatriate footballers in Peru
Club Universitario de Deportes footballers
Expatriate footballers in Germany
Berekum Chelsea F.C. players
Expatriate footballers in Italy
Tema Youth players
Expatriate footballers in Egypt
Footballers from Kumasi
Association football forwards
Al Masry SC players